Maurice Linton Churchill Foster (born  May 9, 1943) played 14 Tests and two One Day Internationals for the West Indies and he was a talented table-tennis player. He attended Wolmer's Schools.

A middle-order batsman and off-spinner, Foster played for Jamaica from 1963–64 to 1977–78, captaining the team from 1972–73 to 1977–78. After scoring centuries in the last two matches of the 1968–69 season as an opening batsman, he was selected to tour England in 1969. He scored 51 not out and 87 not out in the match against Somerset, and made his Test debut in the First Test, but scored only 4 and 3. 

His next Tests were the Fourth and Fifth against India in 1970–71, when he made 36 not out, 24 not out, 99 and 18. Against New Zealand in 1971–72 he made only 93 runs at 23.25 in the first three Tests. He made his only Test hundred, 125, in the First Test against Australia in 1972–73 in front of his home crowd at Kingston, putting on 210 for the fifth wicket with Rohan Kanhai, but still played only four of the five Tests in that series. 

He toured England for a second time in 1973. Although he scored 828 runs at 63.69 in the first-class matches, his only Test was in the innings victory at Lord's (the only time he was on the winning side in 14 Tests; he made 9 runs).  On the tour he was offered a contract to play county cricket for Kent by Colin Cowdrey. He declined because he had a good job in Jamaica and was reluctant to uproot his family. 

Thereafter his appearances were spasmodic as a new generation of batsmen emerged. His last Test, and his last first-class match, was in the Fifth Test against Australia in 1977–78 after the leading West Indies players had forfeited their Test places by signing with Kerry Packer.  Years later, Cowdrey ran across Foster in Barbados and said, “You know Foster, you should have taken up that contract at Kent. Then you would have played a lot more for the West Indies. 

His highest first-class score was 234 for Jamaica against Trinidad in 1976–77, and his best bowling figures were 5 for 65 against Guyana in 1971–72.

According to Michael Holding, Foster's career was affected when his wife asked him to choose between her and a tour of India.  He chose her.

The genial Foster was also an excellent table tennis player, and at one time was West Indies champion. He is the brother of West Indian table tennis champions Joy Foster and the late Dave Foster.

References

External links
 Maurice Foster at Cricinfo
 Maurice Foster at Cricket Archive

1943 births
Living people
Jamaican cricketers
West Indies One Day International cricketers
West Indies Test cricketers
People from Saint Mary Parish, Jamaica
Jamaica cricketers